Futur is the sixth album by French rapper Booba, released on 26 November 2012 on Tallac Records, via the major Universal Music Group.

The album was re-issued in a two-disc set a Futur 2.0 on 25 November 2013 exactly one year after the original release.

The first CD of Futur 2.0 has the same tracks as the original Futur, while CD 2 includes eight new tracks not found on the original release.

Track listing

Charts

Weekly charts
Futur

Futur 2.0

Year-end charts
Futur

Certifications

References

Booba albums
2012 albums
French-language albums
Universal Music Group albums
Tallac Records albums